Roman Wrocławski (born 13 July 1955) is a Polish wrestler. He competed in the men's Greco-Roman 130 kg at the 1988 Summer Olympics.

References

1955 births
Living people
Polish male sport wrestlers
Olympic wrestlers of Poland
Wrestlers at the 1988 Summer Olympics
Sportspeople from Piotrków Trybunalski
Medalists at the 1981 Summer Universiade